Santa María Coyotepec  is a town and municipality in Oaxaca in southern Mexico. The municipality covers an area of  km2. 
It is part of the Centro District in the Valles Centrales region.
As of 2005, the municipality had a total population of 2070.

Zaachila Zapotec is spoken in the town.

References

Municipalities of Oaxaca